Ulupō Heiau on the eastern edge of Kawai Nui Marsh in Kailua, Hawaii, is an ancient site associated in legend with the menehune, but later with high chiefs of Oahu, such as Kakuhihewa in the 15th century and Kualii in the late 17th century. It may have reached the peak of its importance in 1750, before being abandoned after Oahu was conquered in the 1780s. The site became a territorial park in 1954, was partially restored in the early 1960s, marked with a bronze plaque by the State Commission on Historical Sites in 1962, and listed on the National Register of Historic Places in 1972.

Although it probably began as an agricultural heiau (mapele) with springs feeding crops of taro, banana, sweet potato, and sugarcane along the fringes of the  Kawai Nui pond full of mullet and other fish. However, the great warrior chief Kualii may have converted it to a heiau luakini, with an altar, an oracle tower (anuu), thatched hale, and wooden images (kii).

Kailua, with its ample supplies of pond fish, irrigated fields, and canoe landings, was a center of political power for Koolaupoko, which often vied with Waialua for control of Oahu. After defeating the forces of Oahu high chief Kahahana in the 1780s, Maui chief Kahekili lived in Kailua, as did Kamehameha I after conquering Oahu in 1795. In later years, Queen Kalama, consort of Kamehameha III, inherited most of the land in Kailua after the death of her husband in 1854, most of it acquired in 1917 by Harold Kainalu Long Castle for his Kaneohe Ranch. The acquisition of land for Kaneohe Ranch brought about changes to the area due to the grazing and ranching of livestock.

Gallery

References
  Cazimero, T. (1997). Ulupō Heiau State Monument, Kailua, Oʻahu . Honolulu: State of Hawaiʻi, Dept. of Land and Natural Resources, Division of State Parks.
Orr, Maria, et al. Ulupo Heiau Cultural Resources Management and Landscape Plan. 2011.

External links

History of Oahu
Archaeological sites in Hawaii
Properties of religious function on the National Register of Historic Places in Hawaii
Buildings and structures in Honolulu
Archaeological sites on the National Register of Historic Places in Hawaii
Protected areas of Oahu
State parks of Hawaii
Heiau
Protected areas established in 1954
1954 establishments in Hawaii
National Register of Historic Places in Honolulu